Matthew Barnett Robinson is a Criminologist at Appalachian State University (ASU) in Boone, North Carolina.

After receiving his PhD from the Florida State University School of Criminology & Criminal Justice, he accepted a position as assistant professor in the Department of Political Science and Criminal Justice at ASU in 1997, and is now a full professor. The department is now known as the Department of Government & Justice Studies.

Works 
Robinson has published twenty-two books in the areas of criminal justice, crime mapping, criminological theory, corporate crime, media coverage of crime, the war on drugs, the death penalty, social justice, and race and crime in the United States.  His books include Justice Blind? Ideals and Realities of American Criminal Justice (Prentice Hall, 2002, 2005, 2009), Why Crime? An Integrated Systems Theory of Antisocial Behavior (Prentice Hall, 2004), Why Crime? An Interdisciplinary Approach to Explaining Criminal Behavior (Carolina Academic Press, 2009, 2020), Spatial Aspects of Crime: Theory and Practice (Allyn & Bacon, 2004), The Drug Trade and the Criminal Justice System (Pearson, 2005), Crime Mapping and Spatial Aspects of Crime: Theory and Practice (Allyn & Bacon, 2008),  Lies, Damn Lies, and Drug War Statistics (State University of New York Press, 2007, 2013), Death Nation: The Experts Explain American Capital Punishment (Prentice Hall, 2007), Greed is Good: Maximization and Elite Deviance in America (Rowman & Littlefield, 2008), Media Coverage of Crime and Criminal Justice (Carolina Academic Press, 2011, 2014, 2018), Crime Prevention: The Essentials (Bridgepoint Education, 2013), Criminal INjustice: How Politics and Ideology Distort American Ideals (Carolina Academic Press, 2014, 2020), Social Justice, Criminal Justice: The Role of American Law in Effecting and Preventing Social Change (Anderson, 2015), and Race, Ethnicity, Crime, and Justice (Carolina Academic Press, 2015, 2021).

In terms of the death penalty, Robinson's work in "Death Nation" illustrates what scholarly experts think of the death penalty in America. They overwhelmingly characterize the death penalty as a failed policy, and Robinson's review of the latest empirical evidence supports this conclusion. Professor Bohm responds to the book, noting: "Robinson makes a unique contribution to the death penalty debate by presenting the results from his study of 45 death penalty experts and their views on capital punishment.

Robinson's analysis is very thorough and reading the responses of the experts is fascinating ... It is reassuring to know that most people who have studied the death penalty for many years find it to be an archaic punishment not worthy of a modern, civilized society." Professor Ludowise notes: "The death penalty story is good and ... illuminating ... The author has provided a fair and balanced approach to the many facets of the capital punishment policy debated in the U.S." His work was also considered by officials in various states debating whether to continue to utilize the punishment.

Robinson also authored the report, "The Death Penalty in North Carolina: A Summary of the Data and Scientific Studies," which reviews all the studies conducted of the state's death penalty system. The report illustrates five important facts about the death penalty in North Carolina, including that the death penalty is rare, not a deterrent to murder, more costly than life imprisonment, racially biased, and a threat even to innocent people.

Robinson's work on the drug war has led to major challenges to federal drug control policy. He and co-author Renee Scherlen, were invited to Washington, D.C., to debate the top policy analyst/chief scientist at the Office of National Drug Control Policy. Professor Shelden reacted to the work with: "Robinson and Scherlen have provided a thorough critique of the claims made by those in charge of the drug war. This book will no doubt prove to be a valuable resource for those trying to make sense of a war that has created so much havoc within our society."

Incidentally, the first two chapters provide the reader with an excellent overview on the how the drug war came to be, including a brief history of anti-drug legislation. For those not familiar with this history, these chapters will provide much needed information to fill this gap. Read it, learn from it, use it." Ethan Nadelmann, Executive Director of the Drug Policy Alliance, reacts: "Robinson and Scherlen make a valuable contribution to documenting how the Office of National Drug Control Policy fails to live up to basic standards of accountability and consistency."

Professor Gray says: "Dr. Robinson and Dr. Scherlen have performed a valuable service to our democracy with their meticulous analysis of the White House ONDCP public statements and reports.  They have pulled the sheet off what appears to be an official policy of deception using clever and sometimes clumsy attempts at statistical manipulation.  This document, at last, gives us a map to the truth." Nora Callahan of the November Coalition says: "'LIES' is a thorough indictment of ONDCP.  Much of Robinson and Scherlen's analysis reads like prose, revealing the indignation of scientists exposing insidious lies, unaccountable policies and failed objectives -- all supported by federal tax dollars."

Former US Intelligence Analyst Brian Bennett claims: "[I]n a word it is magnificent.  While the book is quite thorough, it is also amazingly concise and easy to read ... an excellent job of completely deconstructing and debunking everything the ONDCP claims." Jack Cole, executive director of Law Enforcement Against Prohibition, claims: "The authors systematically demonstrate empirically the many ways in which the ONDCP has lied over the past [7] years in its annual report of the war on drugs.  The authors' analysis clarifies the despicable actions of the ONDCP and greatly contributes to the arguments of drug policy reformers everywhere."

Paul Armentano of NORML says: "This is an impressive compendium.  I think it's especially effective when you rebuke the ONDCP's claim slide-per-slide.  Also, I'm glad you brought up the fact that the agency has recently restructured their budget numbers to give the impression that there is nearly equal funding for treatment vs interdiction." And Joseph White of Change the Climate claims: "... rather impressive -- very thorough ... I was especially interested in your use of "ideology" as a jumping off point for your critique.  As a philosophy student, I appreciate your pointing to the substance behind ONDCP's madness—i.e., it is all political based on the dominant culture's morality."

In the area of criminological theory, Robinson created the "integrated systems theory" of antisocial behavior which blames much criminality on a wide variety of factors that tend to occur together in space and time. Professor Art Jipson says it "illustrates both the psychological imagination and the gap where some classic criminology has failed. Professors Henry and Lanier refer to the theory as "the most ambitious, comprehensive interdisciplinary attempt so far to move integration of criminological theory to new heights." Professor Walsh calls the book "engaging, extremely well written," and notes that it makes "major contributions to criminology."

Walsh also says: "Robinson's book is a tour de force for the criminologist who wants to learn something about the biosocial perspective." Professor Schmalleger calls the work "among the best work being done in the area of theoretical integration today." Professor Barak says the theory is "consistent with … general criminogenic 'facts of crime' that have been associated with criminal behaviour … built around known risk factors that have been identified by scholars in numerous disciplines such as anthropology, behavioural genetics, biology, economics, neurology, psychology, and sociology … in true interdisciplinary fashion, the integrated systems theory incorporates propositions derived from genetics, brain structure, brain function, brain dysfunction, personality traits, intelligence levels, mental illness, diet and nutrition, drug consumption, family influences, peer influences, social disorganization, routine activities and victim lifestyles, deterrence, labelling, anomie, strain, culture conflict and subcultures, race, class, and gender … incorporates a developmental or life course perspective … consistent with a growing literature on developmental criminology … in harmony with the empirical evidence."

The second edition, co-authored with Kevin Beaver of Florida State University, is called by Professor DeLisi "a tour-de-force through the criminological literature.  Professors Robinson and Beaver have brilliantly explicated the interdisciplinary research on crime in a concise, fun-to-read text." And Professor Wright notes: "What Robinson and Beaver have achieved is striking.  Not only do they integrate a sound understanding of biology's role in criminal conduct into a broader biosocial paradigm, they do so in a way readers will find accessible if not inspiring.  This book will certainly draw the ire of some, but for serious students of crime it will force a reconsideration of cherished beliefs.  For this reason alone, Why Crime? makes a valuable contribution to the study of crime.

The book is now in its third edition, with a new version of the theory featured in the final chapter. This edition features the first ever test of the theory, which found widespread support for the propositions and hypotheses promoted by the theory. The author, Marie Angela Ratchford, concluded: "Overall analyses within the current study supported hypotheses posited by the Integrated Systems Theory … Various factors from genetic levels, to organ levels, to group levels, as well as the interplay between genes and environments were exerted influence over antisocial phenotypes. These significant relationships varied by outcome, environment, ethnicity, and gender, displaying the differential effects of negative contributors in human behavioral development. Integrated Systems Theory represents an important contribution to criminological theoretic literature and should be utilized by researchers in the study of human behavioral development."

Robinson also co-authored the theory called "contextual anomie and strain theory" which attributes corporate criminality to greed in the corporate subculture. Professor Friedrichs notes: "In the midst of the present huge financial crisis, this book could hardly be more timely. The authors offer a novel theoretical framework for enriching our understanding of crimes of the rich and powerful. Matthew Robinson's previous books have been noteworthy additions to the criminological literature. In collaboration with colleague Daniel Murphy, he has once again made a thought-provoking contribution to the field, from which the current generation of students has much to learn." The theory was applied to the collapse of the US economy in 2008, and a review of two official investigations into the "financial crisis" found wide support for the theory.

Criminologist Richard Rosenfeld noted that the theory "is a faithful and 'innovative' application of arguments" he developed with criminologist Steven Messner. Messner noted: "This is great stuff" that has "elaborated anomie theory in an original and insightful manner."

Robinson has also published about 100 other pieces of research and made more than 200 presentations to professional conferences in Criminology and Criminal Justice.  The common theme of Dr. Robinson's work is critical examination of the status quo – whether the criminal justice system, the war on drugs and the death penalty are effective and just.  Robinson critically analyzes widely accepted theories and practices and offers a new perspective that often conflicts with commonly held beliefs and assumptions.

Robinson joined the Bill of Rights Defense Committee and founded a group in Boone to speak out against provisions of the USA PATRIOT Act.  The group successfully saw six resolutions passed, including one by the Town of Boone. The resolution condemned a handful of provisions of the law, several of which have subsequently been declared unconstitutional by courts. Robinson is now working on a Center for Social Justice and Human Rights at ASU to work toward defending the rights of all people, regardless of race, ethnicity, nationality, gender, religion, or sexual orientation.

Robinson is past president of the North Carolina Criminal Justice Association and past president of the Southern Criminal Justice Association. He has served on numerous boards pertaining to the rights of the mentally ill, mediation and restorative justice, as well as protecting civil liberties.

Robinson was recently ranked as one of the most influential criminologists in the world by the group Academic Influence. Robinson is ranked #19 by the organization.

External links
 Official website

American criminologists
Florida State University alumni
People from Fort Lauderdale, Florida
1970 births
Living people